Steeltown Rockers is a comic book limited series published from April to September 1990 by Marvel Comics.  It followed a group of teenagers and young adults during the formation of a rock band.

Overview
The six-issue limited series Steeltown Rockers showcased the efforts of guitarist Johnny Degaestano and his friends to form and maintain a band in a former steel mill town that had become economically depressed since the shuttering of the mill.  The series depicted the perseverance of the musicians as they not only put together the band, sought bookings, and dealt with intragroup personality conflicts but also faced such obstacles as alcoholism, poverty, racial and socioeconomic tension, and drug abuse.  Uncommonly for a Marvel comic at that time, the comic featured no superheroes, no super-villains, and no extraordinary powers of any kind, focusing solely on the lives of ordinary people.  The series presented this material more realistically than was then common, while also showing its characters as neither categorically "good" nor "bad."

Playwright, actress, and comics colorist Elaine Lee wrote the series, which was pencilled and frequently inked by Steve Leialoha.

Connection to Marvel Universe
It is not clear whether Steeltown Rockers takes place in the Marvel Universe, the shared setting for most of the company's output.  The band performs one original song, Teen Mutant, which appears to reference events in the Marvel Universe in a general way.  However, the lyrics could simply mean that the songwriters in the band were fans of Marvel Comics.  Similarly, the cover for the final issue depicts flyers for an X-Men lookalike contest which would be possible in either the real world or the Marvel Universe. In Moon Knight, an album cover showing the name of the Steeltown Rockers was present when the titular character was putting on a Dazzler album, indicating the band does in fact exist in the Marvel universe.

The band --and lead guitarist Johnny Degaestano-- is referenced directly in the opening scene of Marvel's Guardians of the Galaxy video game via an article in the Rolling Stones magazine on the bed. 
" The [Star-Lord] band says that the [Steeltown] Rocker's gig was the only time a crowd chased them off stage. 'He was really cool about it,' Vince says of guitarist Johny Degaestano, 'but that whole steel mill crowd was there for those kids and only them!' "